Frank Saul may refer to:

Frank Saul (basketball) (1924–2019), American National Basketball Association player
Frank Saul (footballer) (born 1943), English former footballer